HMS St Albans was a 50-gun fourth rate ship of the line of the Royal Navy, built at Rotherhithe and launched on 10 December 1706.

St Albans underwent her first rebuild at Plymouth Dockyard, where she was reconstructed to the dimensions laid out in the 1706 Establishment, and relaunched on 6 March 1718. On 10 September 1734 orders were issued for her to be taken to pieces and rebuilt for a second time at Plymouth, though on this occasion according to the 1733 proposals of the 1719 Establishment. She was relaunched on 30 August 1737.

St Albans was wrecked in 1744.

Notes

References

 Lavery, Brian (2003) The Ship of the Line - Volume 1: The development of the battlefleet 1650-1850. Conway Maritime Press. .

External links
 

Ships of the line of the Royal Navy
1700s ships
Ships built in Plymouth, Devon
Ships built in Rotherhithe